Daarlerveen is a railway station in Daarlerveen, The Netherlands. The station was opened on 1 October 1906 and is on the single track Mariënberg–Almelo railway. The line is primarily used by school children in the morning and afternoon. The station has 2 platforms, but one line, because there is a level crossing in between. The train runs over the level crossing first and then stops on the platform. This is so that the level crossing doesn't have to be closed while the train waits.

The station is also used by people of Daarle and Westerhaar-Vriezenveensewijk.

Previously, this station was called Boldijk (1906-1910) and Daarle (1910-1958).

Train services

Platforms

 Platform 1a is the northern one, with the service to Mariënberg.
 Platform 1b is the southern one, with the service to Almelo.

Bus services

References

External links
NS website 
Dutch Public Transport journey planner 

Railway stations in Overijssel
Railway stations opened in 1906
Hellendoorn
1906 establishments in the Netherlands
Railway stations in the Netherlands opened in the 20th century